"Easy Way" is a song by Canadian singer Deborah Cox. It was written by Cox and Rico Love and produced by Love and DTown. The song was released as the lead single from Cox's yet-to-be-titled seventh studio album on November 1, 2019 through her Deco Recording Group. It peaked at number 13 on the US Adult R&B Songs on May 9, 2020.

Music video
An accompanying music video for "Easy Way" was directed by Parris Stewart. It was released on January 29, 2020.

Track listings

Charts

Release history

References

2010s ballads
2019 songs
2019 singles
Contemporary R&B ballads
Deborah Cox songs
Songs written by Rico Love